Operation: Desert Storm is a top-down tank shooter for the Macintosh. It is the first commercial game released by Bungie and the first game since their incorporation, following the freeware title Gnop!, published by Bungie co-founder Alex Seropian under the Bungie name prior to incorporation. It sold about 2,500 copies and was based on Operation Desert Storm, a conflict in the Middle East that was going on at the time.

The game features twenty levels, culminating in the city of Baghdad with the final enemy being a giant Saddam Hussein head. It comes with a glossary of military terms and trivia which was needed in order to bypass the copy-protection in the game, and authentic maps of the Kuwaiti Theater of Operations.

References

1991 video games
Bungie games
Classic Mac OS games
Classic Mac OS-only games
North America-exclusive video games
Video games developed in the United States
Video games set in 1991
Video games set in Iraq
Video games based on real people
Cultural depictions of Saddam Hussein
Gulf War video games

Single-player video games